James W. Vaupel (May 2, 1945 – March 27, 2022) was an American scientist in the fields of aging research, biodemography, and formal demography. He was instrumental in developing and advancing the idea of the plasticity of longevity, and pioneered research on the heterogeneity of mortality risks and on the deceleration of death rates at the highest ages.

Later positions
Vaupel was the founding director of the Max Planck Institute for Demographic Research in Rostock, Germany in 1996.  He was also a research professor at Duke University and the director of its Population, Policy, Aging and Research Center.  Vaupel was a member of the German Academy of Sciences Leopoldina, a regular scientific member of the U.S. National Academy of Sciences and fellow of the American Academy of Arts and Sciences.  He has been involved in many endeavors and published over 20 books.

Contributions
Convinced that formal demography is the source of the discipline's strength, Vaupel has contributed to the methodological foundations of demography.  In 2001 he was awarded by the Population Association of America the Irene B. Taeuber Award for his lifetime research achievements. In 2008 he received the Mindel C. Sheps Award for his work in mathematical demography.

Vaupel has been a leading proponent of the idea of the plasticity of longevity.  Many people believe there is a looming limit to human life expectancy.  Vaupel's research shows that life expectancy is likely to increase well beyond the purported limit of 85 years.  Furthermore, Vaupel and others (such as Bernard Jeune of Denmark) advanced a new proposition: that the human life span is not fixed, but is a function of life expectancy and population size. He and S. Jay Olshansky have had a disagreement about what this means in terms of future projections of the human life span.

Vaupel's work also focuses on the nascent field of evolutionary demography.  His research activities here strive to understand age-specific mortality in terms of the evolutionary processes that shape it.

Because in his studies, particular attention is paid to mortality improvements at the end of the lifespan, Vaupel has been instrumental in the emerging field of research into supercentenarians as a population subset.  The number of persons aged 110+ in a single European nation is rather small. Vaupel therefore began the push in 2000 by inviting experts from around the world to meet in international workshops and to found the International Database on Longevity, which provides information on individuals attaining extreme ages and permits demographic analysis of mortality at the highest ages.

References

External links
 Max Planck Institute for Demographic Research
 Homepage James Vaupel at Population, Policy and Aging Research Center
 Max Planck Society 
 National Academy of Sciences
 American Academy of Arts and Sciences
 Population Association of America
 German Academy of Sciences Leopoldina

1945 births
2022 deaths
American demographers
Scientists from New York City
Members of the United States National Academy of Sciences
University of Minnesota faculty
Max Planck Society people
Mathematicians from New York (state)